Abu `Abdullah Muhammad Ibn ‘Omar Ibn Waqid al-Aslami (Arabic ) (c. 130 – 207 AH; c. 747 – 823 AD) was a historian commonly referred to as al-Waqidi. His surname is derived from his grandfather's name Waqid and thus he became famous as al-Imam al-Waqidi. Al-Waqidi was an early Muslim historian and biographer of the Islamic prophet Muhammad, specializing in his military campaigns. He served as a judge (qadi) for the Abbasid caliph al-Ma'mun. Several of al-Waqidi's works are known through his scribe and student (in the field of the al-maghazi genre), Ibn Sa'd.

Biography
Al-Waqidi was born in Medina around 748 AD (130 AH). He was the mawla (client) of ‘Abd Allah ibn Burayda of the Banu Aslam of Medina. According to Abu Faraj al-Isfahani, al-Waqidi’s mother was the daughter of ‘Isa ibn Ja‘far ibn Sa’ib Khathir, a Persian, and the great-granddaughter of Sa’ib, who introduced music to Medina. Amongst his prominent teachers were Ibn Abi Thahab Ma'mar bin Rashid, Malik ibn Anas and Sufyan al-Thawri. He lived in Medina at the time of Abu Hanifa and Ja'far al-Sadiq and studied in Al-Masjid an-Nabawi as a student of Malik ibn Anas. Al-Waqidi also had access to the grandchildren of Muhammad's companions. Al-Waqidi originally earned a living as a wheat trader, but when a calamity struck at the age of 50, he migrated to Iraq during the reign of Harun ar-Rashid. He was appointed a judge of eastern Baghdad, and Harun ar-Rashid's heir al-Ma'mun later appointed him the qadi of a military camp at Resafa.

Al-Waqidi concentrated on history, and was acknowledged as a master of the genre by his many of his peers. His books on the early Islamic expeditions and conquests predate much of the Sunni and Shia literature of the later Abbasid period. His works regarding the battles of Muhammad and his companions were considered reliable by most early Islamic scholars. While still regarded as an important source for early Islamic history, later authors debated the reliability of his works. Western orientalists who enjoyed his writings include Martin Lings.

Works
Al-Waqidi is primarily known for his Kitab al-Tarikh wa al-Maghazi (Arabic: كتاب التاريخ والمغازي, "Book of History and Campaigns"), which is the only part of his corpus that has been fully preserved. It describes the battles fought by Muhammad, as well as Muhammad's life in the city of Medina. The work draws upon the earlier sira of Ibn Ishaq, though it includes details not found in Ibn Ishaq's text.

A number of works chronicling the Islamic conquests have been attributed to al-Waqidi, though most of these attributions are now believed to be mistaken. Futuh al-Sham (Arabic: كتاب فتوح الشام, "Book of the Conquests of Syria"), a novelization of the Islamic army's conquests of Byzantine Syria, has traditionally been ascribed to al-Waqidi. Modern scholars generally classify Futuh al-Sham as a falsely-attributed later work, dating it to around the time of the Crusades, though some scholars believe a small portion of the text may be traced back to al-Waqidi. In addition to depicting the battles of the Islamic armies, the work also details the valor of various Muslim women, including Hind bint Utbah, Khawlah bint al-Azwar, and Asma bint Abi Bakr.

According to Ibn al-Nadim, al-Waqidi authored a book detailing the death of Husayn ibn Ali, though this work has not survived. Other lost texts attributed to al-Waqidi include a book chronicling the last days of Muhammad's life. The works of al-Waqidi's student Ibn Sa'd may contain some excerpts from these texts.

Criticism

Comparison with earlier commentaries
Historian Patricia Crone gives al-Waqidi as an example of the phenomenon whereby the farther an Islamic commentary on Muhammad's life was removed in time from his life and the events in the Quran, the more information it provided. 
If one storyteller should happen to mention a raid, the next storyteller would know the date of this raid, while the third would know everything that an audience might wish to hear about. 
This was despite the fact later commentaries depended on the earlier sources for their content, which suggested that if later commentaries differed in length from earlier work they should be briefer as some facts about the early days were lost or forgotten. (Crone attributed the phenomenon to storytellers' embellishment.)
Commentary works of Al-Waqidi were much larger than those of the oldest prophetic biography  Ibn Ishaq (died 767)  despite the fact that al-Waqidi's later works covered a shorter period of time (only Muhammad's period in Medina).
Waqidi will always give precise dates, locations, names, where Ibn Ishaq has none, accounts of what triggered the expedition, miscellaneous information to lend color to the event ... But given that this information was all unknown to Ibn Ishaq, its value is doubtful in the extreme. And if spurious information accumulated at this rate in the two generations between Ibn Ishaq and al-Waqidi, it is hard to avoid the conclusion that even more must have accumulated in the three generations between the Prophet and Ibn Ishaq. 

Historian Michael Cook gives an example of the difference in accounts of the death of Muhammad's father Abdullah ibn Abd al-Muttalib.  Ibn Ishaq relates that some say he died while Muhammad's mother was pregnant with Muhammad was born and some while Muhammad was 28 months old; another commentator (Ma'mar ibn Rashid) says that he died in Yathrib after being sent there to lay stores of dates. About a half a century later al-Waqidi relates that 
'Abdallah had gone to Gaza on business, had fallen ill on  the way back, and died in Yathrib after leaving the caravan he was with to be nursed by relations there. Waqidi was further able to specify Abdallah's age at death and the exact place of his burial. ...[that the death] took place ... while Muhammad was still in the womb, 
and that while there were "other accounts of the matter" his was the best.

Critics
Detractors
Waqidi has faced criticism regarding his scholarly reliability from many Sunni Islamic scholars, including:

 al-Shafi’i (d. 204 A.H.) said "All the books of al-Waqidi are lies. In Medina there were seven men who used to fabricate authorities, one of which was al-Waqidi."
 Ahmad ibn Hanbal (d. 241 A.H.) said "He is a liar, makes alternations in the traditions"
 al-Baladhuri (d. 278 A.H.) said "al-Waqidi is matruk (known as a liar).
 Al-Nasa’i (d. 303 A.H.) said "The liars known for fabricating the hadith of the Messenger of Allah are four. They are: Arba’ah b. Abi Yahya in Medina, al-Waqidi in Baghdad, Muqatil b. Sulayman in Khurasan and Muhammad bin Sa’id in Syria."
 Al-Bukhari (d. 256 A.H.) said "al-Waqidi has been abandoned in hadith. He fabricates hadith"
 Al-Dhahabi (d. 748 A.H.) said "Consensus has taken place on the weakness of al-Waqidi"
 Yahya ibn Ma'in (d. 233 A.H.) said "He is weak. He is nothing. Not reliable!"
 Ishaq ibn Rahwayh (d. 238 A.H.) said "According to my view, he is one of those who fabricate Hadith"
 Abu Dawood (d. 275 A.H.) said "I do not write his hadith and I do not report (hadith) on his authority. I have no doubt that he used to make up hadith"
 Abu Hatim Muhammad ibn Idris al-Razi (d. 277 A.H.) said "He fabricates hadith. We have abandoned his hadith"
 Al-Daraqutni (d. 385 A.H.) said "There is weakness in him (in his reporting)"
 Ali ibn al-Madini (d. 241 A.H.)said "He fabricates Hadith"
 Ibn ‘Adi (d. 365 A.H.) said "His traditions are not safe and there is danger from him (in accepting his traditions)"
 Ibn Hajar al-Asqalani (d. 852 A.H.)said "He has been abandoned in spite of vastness of his knowledge"
 Abu Zur’a al-Razi (d. 264 A.H.) said "(Waqidi's writing) Abandoned, Weak"
 Al-Nawawi (d. 676 A.H.): said "Their (muhaddithin scholars) consensus is that al-Waqidi is weak"
 Muhammad Nasiruddin al-Albani (d. 1999 C.E.) said that al-Waqidi is a liar.

Supporters 
Although Al-Waqidi had many detractors he also had many supporters amongst the early Muslims, including but not limited to:
 Al-Darawardi (d. 186 A.H): "Al-Waqidi is a master of traditions."
 Yazid ibn Harun (2d. 206 A.H.): "Al-Waqidi is reliable."
 Abu ‘Ubayd al-Qasim ibn Salam (d. 224 A.H.): "He is reliable."
 Al-Musayyibi (d. 236 A.H.): "Al-Waqidi is Reliable."
 ‘Abbas al-Anbari (d. 246 A.H.) I like him more than al-Razzaq.
 Ya’qub ibn Shaybah (d. 264 A.H.) Some of our people have told me that he was reliable.
 Mus’ab al-Zubayri (d. 236 A.H.)
 Ibrahim al-Harbi (d. 280 A.H.): "Al-Waqidi is a trustee of the people of Islam."
 Muhammad bin Salam Al-Jumahi said: "al-Waqidi is the scholar of his time."

Even among those who questioned his authenticity many still considered him a pillar in history and accepted his narrations in this regard. Ibn Hajar Asqalani records: "He is acceptable in the narrations of the battles according to our companions and Allah knows the best."

Early Islamic scholars

References

External links
 Biodata at MuslimScholars.info

740s births
822 deaths
8th-century Arabs
8th-century historians from the Abbasid Caliphate
9th-century Arabs
9th-century historians from the Abbasid Caliphate
9th-century Arabic writers
People from Medina
Arab people of Iranian descent